William Walsh Robinson (23 June 1888 – 19 April 1972) was a farmer and politician in South Australia.

History
He was born the eldest son of Edwin Robinson (ca.1864 – 31 January 1932) and Mary Ann Robinson (ca.1864 – 1 May 1947), née Horne, of Crystal Brook, later 48 Salisbury Street, Unley.

He was a farmer at Crystal Brook, South Australia and director of South Australian Farmer's Co-operative Union Limited. He was a District Council of Crystal Brook councillor for Napperby Ward from 1924 to 1942 and was the council's chairman from 1929 to 1942. He was appointed J.P. in 1933. He was a charter member of the Crystal Brook Bowling Club in 1923 and Club Chairman 1925 and 1926, and Vice-President of the North Western Agricultural Society.

He served in the Legislative Council for the Liberal and Country League from 8 March 1947 to 5 March 1965.

Family
He married Hannah Amelia “Millie” Latta of Bulls Creek, South Australia on 13 March 1922. Their children included:
son Edwin Latta born 9 June 1923 married Brenda Millard Jones
daughter Ruth  born 11 December 1924 married Henry Stewart 
younger son William Thomas married Alison May Read around 1955.
Around 1950 they moved to 17 Holden Street, Kensington Park.

References 

Members of the South Australian Legislative Council
Australian farmers
1888 births
1972 deaths
Liberal and Country League politicians
20th-century Australian politicians
Mayors of places in South Australia